Girta is an unincorporated community in Ritchie County, West Virginia, United States.

The community was named after Girta Nutter, the daughter of an early postmaster.

References 

Unincorporated communities in West Virginia
Unincorporated communities in Ritchie County, West Virginia